Arcadia is a historical part of Odesa, Ukraine, which is known as a famous resort. It is located in the coastal part of the city, close to the quarters of 5th and 7th stations of Velyky Fontan. The quarter was named after a mountainous district in Greece, which was known as the home of pastoral villagers.

The famous Arcadia Beach and Arcadia Park are located in the district.

Sources 

 Саркисьян К. С., Ставницер М. Ф. Улицы рассказывают / Художник В. А. Новорусский. — Изд. 3-е, перераб. и доп. — Одесса: Маяк, 1972. — С. 62 - 65.

 
Geography of Odesa
Resorts in Ukraine